A linchpin, also spelled linch pin, lynchpin, or lynch pin, is a fastener used to prevent a wheel or other part from sliding off the axle upon which it is riding. The word is first attested in the late fourteenth century and derives from Middle English elements meaning "axletree pin".

Securing implements onto the three-point hitch of a tractor is an example of application.  Linchpins may also be used in place of an R-clip for securing hitch pins.

Metaphorical use
The word "linchpin" is also used figuratively to mean "something [or someone] that holds the various elements of a complicated structure together".

See also

References

External links

Fasteners